The 1946–47 La Liga was the 16th season since its establishment. Valencia conquered their third title.

Team locations

League table

Results

Relegation play-offs
Match was played at Estadio Metropolitano de Madrid.

|}

Top scorers

External links
 Official LFP Site

1946 1947
1946–47 in Spanish football leagues
Spain